The Ryck is a river in Mecklenburg-Vorpommern, Germany.

The larger part of the river outside Greifswald is also referred to as Ryckgraben. In Greifswald, the Ryck provided both the medieval Hanseatic port and natural salt evaporation ponds, as due to the low elevation, hypersaline water of the Baltic Sea is driven into the river by the wind, flooding the lower meadows on the Ryck's northern bank.

In the High Middle Ages, the Ryck marked the southern border of the Principality of Rügen and the northern border of the County of Gützkow. West of Greifswald, the Ryck fed the Boltenhägener Teich, a medieval lake.

The old Hanseatic port in Greifswald is now an open-air ship museum.

Rivers of Mecklenburg-Western Pomerania
Federal waterways in Germany
Rivers of Germany